Bárcena de Pie de Concha is a municipality located in the autonomous community of Cantabria, Spain. According to the 2007 census, the city has a population of 825 inhabitants.

Towns
 Bárcena de Pie de Concha (Seat)
Pie de Concha
Pujayo
Montabliz (abandoned)

Notable people 
 Luis Araquistáin  (1886 – Geneva, Switzerland, 1959) was a Spanish politician and writer.

Gallery

References 

Populated places in Cantabria